Table tennis, for the 2017 Island Games, held at the Södervärnshallen, Visby, Gotland, Sweden in June 2017.

100 competitors from 14 islands will compete in 6 events.

General 
Table tennis has appeared as an event in the Island Games in every year except in 2013, Gotland has led the medals table over the years.

Guernsey has named a team of eight, four men and four women.

Medal table

Results

See also
2017 in table tennis

References

Island Games
2017
Table Tennis